Akeem O'Connor-Ward (born January 5, 1996) is an American soccer player who plays as a defender for Memphis 901 in the USL Championship.

Career
Ward was selected 14th overall by D.C. United in the 2019 MLS SuperDraft, and he signed a professional contract with the club on January 31, 2019. “We had him rated as the best right back in the draft,” said United GM Dave Kasper. “We liked everything about him."

He was loaned out to D.C.'s USL affiliate Loudoun United in March 2019. He made his USL Championship debut on March 9, 2019, as he played all ninety minutes in a 2–0 away defeat to Nashville SC. He was waived by DC United on July 24, 2019.

Ward joined USL Championship side Birmingham Legion FC on July 30, 2019.

In February 2020, Ward signed with North Carolina FC. He scored the first goal of his professional career on August 8, 2020, the lone tally in a 1–0 NCFC win over Memphis 901 FC. He was later suspended for two games by the USL Championship for kicking Charlotte Independence player Clay Dimick in the neck during a game on August 26, 2020. Ward apologized in a tweet, saying he "lashed out" without intending to hit Dimick.

On January 13, 2021, Ward signed with Oakland Roots ahead of their inaugural USL Championship season. On July 8, 2022, Ward was loaned to USL Championship side Rio Grande Valley FC for the remainder of the season. He left Oakland following their 2022 season.

Ward joined Memphis 901 on January 18, 2023.

References

External links
D.C. United profile
Creighton profile

Living people
1996 births
American soccer players
Soccer players from Virginia
People from Vienna, Virginia
Association football defenders
Creighton Bluejays men's soccer players
Lane United FC players
Chicago FC United players
D.C. United draft picks
D.C. United players
Loudoun United FC players
Birmingham Legion FC players
North Carolina FC players
Oakland Roots SC players
Rio Grande Valley FC Toros players
Memphis 901 FC players
USL League Two players
Major League Soccer players
USL Championship players
Hastings College alumni